The Tanah Merah railway station is a Malaysian railway station located in Tanah Merah District, Kelantan, Malaysia. It is one of the two minor railway stations of KTM's East Coast Line.

Train services
 Ekspres Rakyat Timuran 26/27 Tumpat–JB Sentral
 Shuttle Timur 51/52/57/60 Tumpat–Gua Musang
 Shuttle Timur 55/56 Tumpat–Dabong

About the Station
The station is often prone to floods. It is also the only KTM railway station located inside a town. Only KTM Intercity trains stop at this station.

External links

Kuala Lumpur MRT & KTM Intercity Integrations

KTM East Coast Line stations
Railway stations opened in 1914
Railway stations in Kelantan
Tanah Merah District